The Long Wait is a 1954 American crime drama film noir directed by Victor Saville starring Anthony Quinn, Charles Coburn, Gene Evans and Peggie Castle. The film is based on the 1951 novel of the same title by Mickey Spillane. It was an independent production distributed by United Artists.

Plot
Johnny McBride is badly hurt while hitch hiking and loses his memory when the car he is riding in crashes. Two years later, a clue leads him to his old home town, where he finds he is a murder suspect. McBride tries to clear his name of the presumed murder charges. Thugs working for the local mob boss try to end his meddling.

Cast
 Anthony Quinn as Johnny McBride
 Charles Coburn as Gardiner
 Gene Evans as Servo
 Peggie Castle as Venus
 Mary Ellen Kay as Wendy Miller
 Shirley Patterson as Carol Shay
 Dolores Donlon as Troy Avalon
 Barry Kelley as Tucker
 James Millican as Police Capt. Lindsey
 Bruno VeSota as Eddie Packman 
 Jay Adler as Joe—Bellhop
 John Damler as Alan Logan
 Frank Marlowe as Pop Henderson

Reception
The New York Times called it slow-paced, boring, and likely to disappoint fans of the novel.

Noir analysis
Film Noir: An Encyclopedic Reference to the American Style by Alain Silver and Elizabeth Ward writes: "The inclusion of amnesia, giving the hero a sense of hopelessness compounded by the frustration of his loss of identity, instills a distinct existential bias into McBride's search. This attitude combines with a pervading sense of corruption and dehumanization to give The Long Wait a fatalistic noir ethos."

References

Further reading

External links
 
 
 
 

1954 films
American black-and-white films
Film noir
Films about amnesia
Films based on American novels
Films based on works by Mickey Spillane
Films directed by Victor Saville
United Artists films
Films with screenplays by Lesser Samuels
Films scored by Mario Castelnuovo-Tedesco
American crime drama films
1954 crime drama films
1950s English-language films
1950s American films